The Trenton Line is a SEPTA commuter rail line between Trenton, New Jersey and Philadelphia.

Trenton Line may also refer to:

Trenton Subdivision (CSX Transportation), a rail line in Pennsylvania and New Jersey owned by CSX Transportation (SEPTA West Trenton Line)

See also
West Trenton Line (disambiguation)